Galeopsis ladanum is a species of flowering plant belonging to the family Lamiaceae.

Its native range is Europe to Central Asia.

References

ladanum